Stephen Fitzsimons (4 February 1882 – 14 January 1952) was an Irish Gaelic footballer. His championship career with the Louth senior team spanned several seasons during the first decade of the 20th century and he won an All-Ireland medal in 1912. His brother, John Fitzsimons, also had All-Ireland success with Louth.

Honours

Louth
All-Ireland Senior Football Championship (1): 1912
Leinster Senior Football Championship (1): 1912

References

1882 births
1952 deaths
Louth inter-county Gaelic footballers